Punjabi Virsa 2018 was a live concert tour by Kamal Heer, Manmohan Waris and Sangtar. This live musical Punjabi concert is performed every year in different countries since 2004 under title name Punjabi Virsa. This year it was performed in various cities of Canada in months of August and September 2018. It is presented by Plasma Records.

Tour dates

Tracks 
All music composed by Sangtar.

See also 

 Punjabi Virsa 2005
 Punjabi Virsa 2006
 Punjabi Virsa 2007
 Punjabi Virsa 2008
 Punjabi Virsa 2009
 Punjabi Virsa 2010

References 

2018 concert tours
Folk albums by Indian artists
World music albums by Indian artists
Punjabi Virsa
Waris Brothers
2018 live albums